Almasi, as a title without diacritical marks, may refer to:
Almāsī, a village in East Azerbaijan Province, Iran
Almási, a surname

See also
Almas (disambiguation)